Army of the Rhine may refer to:
Several French armies (Armée du Rhin):
Army of the Rhine (1791–1795)
Merged into the Army of the Rhine and Moselle from 1795 to 1797
Army of the Rhine (1870)
Army of the Rhine (1919–30)
First Army, called the Army of the Rhine and Danube (1943–45)
British Army of the Rhine (BAOR), an army of occupation in Germany post-1918